The 1967 Norwegian Football Cup was the 62nd edition of the Norwegian annual knockout football tournament. The Cup was won by Lyn after beating Rosenborg in the cup final with the score 4–1. This was Lyn's seventh Norwegian Cup title.

First round

{{OneLegResult|Flekkefjord||1–3|Buøy}}

|-
|colspan="3" style="background-color:#97DEFF"|Replay

|}

Second round

|-
|colspan="3" style="background-color:#97DEFF"|Replay

|}

Third round

|colspan="3" style="background-color:#97DEFF"|21 June 1967

|-
|colspan="3" style="background-color:#97DEFF"|22 June 1967

|-
|colspan="3" style="background-color:#97DEFF"|25 June 1967

|-
|colspan="3" style="background-color:#97DEFF"|Replay: 28 June 1967

|}

Fourth round

|colspan="3" style="background-color:#97DEFF"|13 August 1967

|}

Quarter-finals

|colspan="3" style="background-color:#97DEFF"|27 August 1967

|}

Semi-finals

|colspan="3" style="background-color:#97DEFF"|1 October 1967

|}

Final

Lyn's winning squad
Svein Bjørn Olsen, Jan Rodvang, Kjell Saga, Helge Østvold, Knut Kolle, Svein Bredo Østlien, Andreas Morisbak, Jan Berg, Harald Berg, Ola Dybwad-Olsen, Knut Berg, Reidar Tessem, Tom Ørehagen and Sveinung Aarnseth.

References
http://www.rsssf.no

Norwegian Football Cup seasons
Norway
Football Cup